Park Sung-hwan (Hangul: 박성환; Hanja: 朴成煥; born September 4, 1984 in Jeju-do) is a badminton player from South Korea. Park is the top-ranked men's singles player in South Korea and has succeeded at an international level, winning individual medals at both the 2010 World Championships and the 2010 Asian Games.

Career

2004-2007
In 2005, Park won the Indonesia International and then competed at the 2007 BWF World Championships in the men's singles division; for the latter, he was defeated in the third round by Chen Yu, of the China, with a final score of: 15-21, 21-16, 21-15.

2008
In 2008, Park competed in the 2008 Summer Olympic Games in Beijing, China, but was unable to move beyond the first round and second rounds. He was defeated by Taufik Hidayat, Lee Hyun-il, Sho Sasaki (Japan), Lee Chong Wei (Malaysia) and the world number one player at the time, Lin Dan (China). During this year, Park won the Badminton Asia Championships and the Korea International Challenge titles, beating China's Chen Jin (21-18, 21-18) and South Korean, Lee Cheol Ho (21-14, 21-13) respectively.

2009
Park entered the Proton Malaysian Open, held in January, and played the world number one-ranked player at the time, Lee Chong Wei, in the final—Park lost with a score of 14-21, 13-21. The following week, Park joined the Korea Open Super Series and was again stopped by the number-one seed, Lee Chong Wei of Malaysia, with a score of 21-18, 7-21, 16-21 in the quarter-final match. Park skipped the All England Open Super Series and the Wilson Swiss Open Super Series, both held in March.

In May, he entered the Li Ning Sudirman Cup, held in China. The Sudirman Cup was a team competition and the South Korean team reached the final in which they played against the Chinese team. Park Sung-hwan was defeated in the final, with a score of 14-21, 18-21, in a match against the Olympic champion, Lin Dan, and lost one point for his team. The South Korean team was eventually awarded the silver medal, having lost 0-3 to China.

Park then participated in the Aviva Singapore Open Super Series in April, where he reached the semi-finals. Boonsak Ponsana, from Thailand, eventually won the tournament, beating Park with a score of 19-21, 21-18, 13-21. A week later, Park joined the Djarum Indonesia Open Super Series and lost to the world number one, Lee Chong Wei, 9-21, 13-21, in the quarter-final match. Two months later, Park entered the Chinese Taipei Grand Prix Gold Open, which is held in the last week of August, and was beaten by Muhammad Hafiz Hashim from Malaysia, 15-21, 18-21, again in the quarter-final match. Two weeks later, Park was to be defeated again in the quarter-final matches of the Li Ning China Masters Super Series in Changzhou, China (to 4th seed badminton ace Lin Dan of China, 15-21, 21-13, 21-23), and the Japan Open Super Series (to Indonesian, Taufik Hidayat, 21-12, 26-28, 15-21).

In November, Park participated in the Yonex Sunrise Hong Kong Open and lost 15-21, 16-21, against Hong Kong player, Chan Yan Kit, in the second round. Park's next event was the China Open Super Series, held in Shanghai, China, where he reached the semi-final round and lost to the 2009 World Badminton Championships champion, Lin Dan; the final score was 10-21, 11-21.

2010
Park entered the Super Series tournament of the Korea Open, which is held in January, and was eliminated in the quarter-final stage by Denmark's Peter Gade, 21-17, 16-21, 20-22. Park then lost 16-21, 17-21, to Du Pengyu from China in the first round of the Malaysia Open. In March, at the All England Open, Park lost in the second round, 5-21, 10-21, to 6th seed, Bao Chunlai of China, after defeating Japan's Sho Sasaki, 21-13 21-11, in the opening round. The All England Open was followed by the Wilson Swiss Open, held at the Basel Stadium in Switzerland, and after defeating Lithuania's Kestutis Navickas, 21-13, 21-13, in the opening round, Park lost to Dane, Peter Gade, in straight games: 15-21, 16-21.

In May, Park returned to Malaysia for the 2010 Proton Thomas & Uber Cup Finals, held in the capital city, Kuala Lumpur. Park again was beaten by China's Lin Dan, 18-21, 23-25, in the second round and had conceded one point for his team. In the quarter-final match, Park played against Dan once again and lost 16-21, 15-21. Meanwhile, his team members also lost to the other Chinese players. The final score was 0-3 in favour of the Chinese team.

In August, Park's entered the 2010 BWF World Championships, where he made it through to the semi-final, registering a win against Lin Dan, 21-13 21-13, in the quarter-final. However, Indonesia's Taufik Hidayat later defeated Park with a score of 10-21, 20-22, in the last four; Park emerged with the bronze medal. After the world championships, Park played in the China Masters Super Series in Changzhou, China, in September. On this occasion, he lost to Lin Dan, 11-21, 17-21, in the opening round. Park then entered the Japan Open Super Series and was again matched up against Lin Dan following a victory in the second round. In the final eight, Park was knocked out by Lin Dan, 20-22, 16-21.

The Asian Games team challenge was held in November in Guangzhou, China. Park represented Korea in the finals, meeting Lin Dan on yet another occasion, and, again, lost with a score of 21-19, 16-21, 18-21. The Korean team eventually won the silver medal, losing 1-3 to the Chinese team. In the individual match section of the Asian Games, Park faced Lin Dan in the semi-finals and was defeated 14-21, 10-21, winning a bronze medal for Korea. The next month, Park joined the China Open Super Series in Shanghai and defeated China's Wang Zhengming in the opening round with a score of 21-5, 11-21, 21-17. In the second round, Park lost to 5th seed, Chen Long of China, 12-21, 16-21, signaling the South Korean's exit from the tournament.

Achievements

BWF World Championships 
Men's singles

Asian Games
Men's singles

Asian Championships
Men's singles

World Junior Championships
Boys' singles

Boys' doubles

Asian Junior Championships
Boys' singles

BWF Superseries  
The BWF Superseries, launched on 14 December 2006 and implemented in 2007, is a series of elite badminton tournaments, sanctioned by Badminton World Federation (BWF). BWF Superseries has two levels: Superseries and Superseries Premier. A season of Superseries features twelve tournaments around the world, which introduced since 2011, with successful players invited to the Superseries Finals held at the year end.

Men's singles

 BWF Superseries Finals tournament
 BWF Superseries Premier tournament
 BWF Superseries tournament

BWF Grand Prix 
The BWF Grand Prix has two level such as Grand Prix and Grand Prix Gold. It is a series of badminton tournaments, sanctioned by Badminton World Federation (BWF) since 2007. The World Badminton Grand Prix has been sanctioned by the International Badminton Federation since 1983.

Men's singles

 BWF Grand Prix Gold tournament
 BWF & IBF Grand Prix tournament

BWF International Challenge/Series
Men's Singles

 BWF International Challenge tournament
 BWF International Series tournament

References

1984 births
Living people
Sportspeople from Jeju Province
South Korean male badminton players
Badminton players at the 2008 Summer Olympics
Olympic badminton players of South Korea
Badminton players at the 2006 Asian Games
Badminton players at the 2010 Asian Games
Asian Games silver medalists for South Korea
Asian Games bronze medalists for South Korea
Asian Games medalists in badminton
Medalists at the 2006 Asian Games
Medalists at the 2010 Asian Games